Jerad Joseph Eickhoff (born July 2, 1990), is an American professional baseball pitcher who is currently a free agent. He has previously played in MLB for the Philadelphia Phillies, New York Mets and Pittsburgh Pirates. Eickhoff was drafted by the Texas Rangers in the 15th round (474th overall) of the 2011 Major League Baseball draft.

Early life 
Eickhoff was born on July 2, 1990, in Evansville, Indiana. His father, Ron, was a local carpenter who would help Eickhoff and his brothers, Jonathan and Jordan, practice baseball in their backyard. His mother DeeDee, meanwhile, drove Eickhoff and his brothers to baseball games and tournaments throughout their childhood. Growing up, Eickhoff was a supporter of the St. Louis Cardinals of Major League Baseball (MLB), and frequently attended games at Busch Memorial Stadium.

Eickhoff played baseball and basketball at Mater Dei High School in Indiana. He was primarily a third baseman, and only began pitching during his junior year. Eickhoff went mostly unnoticed by scouts and college recruiters until October 2008, where, as a senior with his fall travel team, Eickhoff pitched seven strong innings at the World Wood Bat Association (WWBA) National Championships. Eickhoff would eventually become the second Mater Dei alumnus to play in MLB, following Rob Maurer.

College career 
Following his WWBA performance, Eickhoff received offers from baseball programs at schools like Michigan State and Indiana University, but many of those programs wanted him to play as a walk-on pitcher. A scout for the Baltimore Orioles suggested that Eickhoff attend a junior college, where he was more likely to receive playing time. Eickhoff ultimately committed to play college baseball as a pitcher for Olney Central College in Olney, Illinois. After his freshman season, the Chicago Cubs selected Eickhoff in the 46th round of the 2010 MLB Draft. He declined to sign with the team, choosing instead to return to Olney. That year, Eickhoff played collegiate summer baseball with the Wisconsin Woodchucks of the Northwoods League. He made 16 appearances with the Woodchucks, posting a 3–2 win–loss record and a 6.69 earned run average (ERA), while striking out 35 batters in 39 innings pitched.

He posted a 10–4 record and a 1.90 ERA for the year, enough to win the title of Great Rivers Athletic Conference Pitcher of the Year. He also set a school record with 116 strikeouts in  innings, while walking only 27. After the season, Eickhoff committed to Western Kentucky University.

Professional career

Texas Rangers
The Texas Rangers selected Eickhoff in the 15th round of the 2011 MLB Draft, and he agreed to nullify his National Letter of Intent with Western Kentucky in order to sign with the Rangers. He was initially assigned to the Rookie Arizona League Rangers, but was promoted to the Class A Short-Season Spokane Indians of the Northwest League after only four games. In 14 appearances between Arizona and Spokane, Eickhoff was 1–2 in his rookie season, with a 2.37 ERA and 22 strikeouts in 19 innings pitched.

In 2012, Eickhoff pitched for the Class A Hickory Crawdads of the South Atlantic League. He was 13–7 with a 4.69 ERA — his 13 wins were third in the league and matched the 2nd-highest single-season win total in team history.

Eickhoff started 2013 with the Class A-Advanced Myrtle Beach Pelicans of the Carolina League, and was promoted to the Double-A Frisco RoughRiders of the Texas League during the season. He had the 3rd-lowest WHIP (1.17) and the 8th-lowest ERA (3.41) in the Carolina League, and his 11 wild pitches were 6th in the league.

Eickhoff returned to Frisco in 2014, where he was named Pitcher of the Week, on May 5. Eickhoff's 144 strikeouts and 12 wild pitches with Frisco led the Texas League, and his 1.17 WHIP was 4th-best in the league.

In 2015, between Frisco, the Round Rock Express, and the Lehigh Valley IronPigs, Eickhoff was 12–5, with a 3.85 ERA, and 126 strikeouts, in 133.1 innings. In 2017, with the Reading Fightin Phils he was 0–1 with a 1.80 ERA in one start. In 2018, with the Clearwater Threshers, Reading, and Lehigh Valley he was 0–1 with a 2.90 in eight starts. In 2019, with Clearwater, Reading, and Lehigh Valley he was 3–2 with a 5.93 ERA in eight starts.

Philadelphia Phillies
On July 31, 2015, the Rangers traded Eickhoff, Nick Williams, Matt Harrison, Jake Thompson, Alec Asher, and Jorge Alfaro to the Philadelphia Phillies for Cole Hamels and Jake Diekman. He made his major league debut for the Phillies on August 21. Eickhoff's 2015 big league pitching totals included a  3-3 win–loss record with a 2.65 ERA, while he struck out 49 batters in 51 innings pitched.

In 2016 (his first full season with the Phillies), Eickhoff was 11–14, with a 3.65 ERA, gave up 1.92 walks per 9 innings pitched (4th in the National League), had 20 quality starts (tied for 6th), struck out 167 batters in 197.1 innings (8th), and had a strikeout-to-walk ratio of 3.976 (9th).

In 2017, Eickhoff was 4–8, with a 4.71 ERA, and struck out 118 batters, in 128 innings. He held opposing hitters to a .218 batting average with runners in scoring position, the 6th-lowest average among NL pitchers. Eickhoff missed the end of the 2017 season because he was experiencing numbness in his fingers.

In 2018, Eickhoff was 0–1, with a 6.75 ERA, and struck out 11 batters in 5.1 innings. In a game on September 28, against Atlanta, he tied a Phillies franchise record shared by Steve Carlton in 1981 and Curt Schilling in 1996, (Later Broken by Aaron Nola in 2021) by striking out seven consecutive batters at one point. Eickhoff missed most of the season due to a strained back muscle, followed by a return of the numbness in his fingers, which caused him to be put on the disabled list. He met with a number of specialists during the summer to evaluate nerve damage that was leading to the numbness, twinges, and tingling in the fingers of his right hand, especially when he threw his curveball; their diagnoses ranged from thoracic outlet syndrome (which was ruled out) to carpal tunnel syndrome, and Eickhoff was given two cortisone shots. In the off-season he signed a one-year contract for $975,000.

In 2019 with the Phillies he was 3–4 with one save and a 5.71 ERA, and struck out 51 batters in 58.1 innings. He ended the season on the injured list, first with right biceps tendinitis and then with a blister/laceration on his right middle finger.

San Diego Padres
On December 27, 2019, Eickhoff signed a minor league deal with the San Diego Padres. On August 2, 2020, Eickhoff's contract was selected to the active roster. The next day he was optioned down and he was outrighted off of the roster on August 24, without making a major league appearance. He elected free agency on August 26, 2020.

Texas Rangers (second stint)
On August 30, 2020, Eickhoff signed a minor league contract with the Texas Rangers. He did not play in a game with the Rangers organization due to the cancellation of the minor league season because of the COVID-19 pandemic. He became a free agent on November 2, 2020.

New York Mets
On December 15, 2020, Eickhoff signed a minor league contract with the New York Mets organization. He was assigned to the Triple-A Syracuse Mets to begin the year. On June 20, Eickhoff was selected to the active roster. After posting a 4.50 ERA in 2 starts for the Mets, Eickhoff was designated for assignment on June 29. He was outrighted to Syracuse on July 3. However, Eickhoff rejected the assignment and elected free agency. Eickhoff re-signed with the Mets on a minor league contract on July 5. On July 11, Eickhoff was re-selected to the active roster. Eickhoff allowed 4 runs in 6.1 innings of work before he was designated for assignment a second time on July 20. Eickhoff elected free agency for a second time on July 24. Eickhoff again re-signed with the Mets organization on a minor league contract. On July 27, Eickhoff was added to the team's major league roster for a third time. That day, Eickhoff took the loss after giving up 10 runs in his start against the Atlanta Braves, and was designated for assignment yet again the following day.
On October 6, 2021, Eickhoff elected free agency.

Pittsburgh Pirates
On November 30, 2021, Eickhoff signed a minor league contract with the Pittsburgh Pirates. He had his contract selected on June 22 and was designated for assignment on June 24.

References

External links

1990 births
Living people
Baseball players from Indiana
Sportspeople from Evansville, Indiana
Major League Baseball pitchers
Philadelphia Phillies players
New York Mets players
Pittsburgh Pirates players
Arizona League Rangers players
Spokane Indians players
Hickory Crawdads players
Myrtle Beach Pelicans players
Frisco RoughRiders players
Round Rock Express players
Lehigh Valley IronPigs players
Syracuse Mets players
Indianapolis Indians players
Wisconsin Woodchucks players